Ya Sang or Yaa Sang is a form of black magic said to be performed in Thailand's northeast, Isan.  It is based on traditional knowledge of plant poisons, some causing stomach ailments, physical pain, and intoxication, leading to death.

Magic (supernatural)
Thai culture